Elias Ellefsen á Skipagøtu (born 19 May 2002) is a Faroese handball player for IK Sävehof and the Faroese national team.

He participated at the 2022 European Men's Under-20 Championship.

Achievements 
 Swedish Handball League
Winner: 2021
 Swedish Handball Cup
Winner: 2022
 European Open Handball Championship
Winner: 2019

Individual Awards
 MVP of Handbollsligan 2021/2022
 All-Star Team as Best centre back of Handbollsligan 2021/2022

Personal life 
His younger brother Roi Ellefsen á Skipagøtu is also a handball player.

He is the cousin of handball player Óli Mittún, also playing for IK Sävehof. He is also cousin of handball player Pauli Mittún.

References

2002 births
Living people
Faroese male handball players
IK Sävehof players
Expatriate handball players
Handball players from Copenhagen